Club Sportiv Lotus Băile Felix, commonly known as Lotus Băile Felix, or simply as Lotus, is a Romanian football club based in Băile Felix, Sânmartin, Bihor County, currently playing in the Liga III.

Lotus Băile Felix was founded on 16 June 2009 under the name of CSC Sânmartin and played for most of its existence at the amateur level, in the Liga IV. Promoted in 2014 in the third tier, the club resisted only one season before withdrawing due to financial difficulties. In 2019, with the financial support of the Commune of Sânmartin, the biggest and one of the richest communes in Bihor County, fact owed to the presence of thermal waters in the area, CSC managed to won Liga IV, Bihor County series and also the promotion play-off, promoting back to Liga III.

In the summer of 2021, the club went through a process of re-branding, changing its name from CSC Sânmartin to CS Lotus Băile Felix, bringing in the front the name of Băile Felix, a Romanian well known thermal spa resort that is under Sânmartin Commune administration.

History
Lotus Băile Felix was founded on 16 June 2009 under the name of CSC Sânmartin and until 2014 played only at the amateur level. At the end of the 2013–14 season, CSC managed to won Liga IV, Bihor County series, as well as the promotion play-off against Sportul Șimleu Silvaniei and was promoted for the first time in its history in the Liga III. After only one season, the club withdrew due to financial difficulties and played again at amateur level until it managed to promote at the end of the 2018–19 campaign, this time financially supported by the Commune of Sânmartin. Under the command of Călin Cheregi, former manager of FC Bihor Oradea, sânmartinenii won Bihor County series after a tough battle against Club Atletic Oradea, then winning the promotion play-off with 4–0 on aggregate, against Cluj County champions, CS Florești.

In the summer of 2021, the club went through a process of re-branding, changing its name from CSC Sânmartin to CS Lotus Băile Felix, bringing in the front the name of Băile Felix, a Romanian well known thermal spa resort that is under Sânmartin Commune administration.

Grounds

Over its relatively short history, Lotus Băile Felix played its home matches on various grounds such as Luceafărul Stadium, Cordău Stadium or Sântion Stadium. In 2018 the club started to build its own ground near the stadium of the local rival, Luceafărul Oradea. In the summer of 2020, Comunal Stadium was opened, with a capacity of 1,000 people (500 on seats).

Honours
Liga IV – Bihor County
Winners (3): 2013–14, 2017–18, 2018–19

Cupa României – Bihor County
Winners (1): 2018–19

Players

First team squad

Out on loan

Club Officials

Board of directors

Current technical staff

League history

References

External links
 CS Lotus Băile Felix at frf-ajf.ro

Football clubs in Bihor County
Association football clubs established in 2009
Liga III clubs
Liga IV clubs
2009 establishments in Romania